Julie Kathryn Ward is the President of the New South Wales Court of Appeal within the Supreme Court of New South Wales, the highest court in the State of New South Wales, Australia.

Education 
Ward studied French and Law at the University of Sydney, graduating in 1982 with First Class Honours and the University medal. After graduation Ward served as associate to Justice Nigel Bowen, the first Chief Justice of the Federal Court of Australia. She then commenced as a solicitor at Stephen Jaques Stone James (later Mallesons Stephen Jacques, now King & Wood Mallesons) in 1982. Ward later received a post-graduate scholarship from Sydney Law School and studied at the University of Oxford.

Career 
In 1988, Ward was made a partner at Mallesons. In 2008 she was appointed as a judge of the Supreme Court of New South Wales. Ward is among the very few solicitors, and the first woman, to have been appointed directly to the bench. After four years as a trial judge Ward was appointed to the Court of Appeal. In 2017 Ward was appointed Chief Judge in Equity, and in 2022 she was appointed President of the New South Wales Court of Appeal.

References 

 

Living people
University of Sydney alumni
Sydney Law School alumni
Judges of the Supreme Court of New South Wales
Australian women judges
Year of birth missing (living people)